Michel Baron (8 October 1653 – 22 December 1729) was a French actor and playwright.

Life
His family name was originally Boyron. His father and mother were leading players, André Boiron and Jeanne Auzoult. He was born in Paris. He was orphaned at age 9, and joined the child company Petits Comédiens Dauphins at age 12, becoming its brightest star. Baron came to the notice of Molière, joined his troupe, and eventually became his protégé. He left the troupe after a conflict with Molière's wife, Armande Béjart, but rejoined in 1670. He played the role of Domitien in Pierre Corneille's Tite et Bérénice and played in Corneille's Psyché. He stayed with the troupe until Molière's death in 1673, when he joined the troupe at the Hotel de Bourgogne. This troupe merged with another in 1680 to become the Comédie-Française.

With Comédie-Française, Baron was the undisputed master of the French stage until his retirement in 1691. He created many of the leading roles in Racine's plays, and in his own L'Homme à bonnes fortunes (1686), his most popular play, and La Coquette. He also wrote Les Enlèvements and Le Debauche, and translated and acted in two plays by Terence.

After retiring in 1691, Baron re-appeared in 1720 at the Palais Royal, and was very active. During his last years on stage, he regularly performed with Adrienne Lecouvreur. He died on 22 December 1729.

Barons's son Étienne Michel Baron (1676–1711) was also an actor. Etienne's son and two daughters all acted with the Comédie-Française.

References

Attribution

External links
 
The Lucky Man by Michel Baron at Project Gutenberg - a translation of L'homme à bonne fortune

1653 births
1729 deaths
17th-century French male actors
18th-century French male actors
French male stage actors
17th-century French dramatists and playwrights
17th-century French male writers
18th-century French dramatists and playwrights
Sociétaires of the Comédie-Française